Yinhawangka (Inawangga) is a Pama–Nyungan language of Western Australia. Dench (1995) believed there was insufficient data to enable it to be confidently classified, but Bowern & Koch (2004) include it among the Ngayarda languages without proviso.

See also
Ngarla language

References

Ngarla